The Taipei Metro Jingmei station (formerly transliterated as Chingmei Station until 2003) is located in Wenshan District, Taipei, Taiwan. It is on the Songshan–Xindian line.

Station overview
This two-level, underground station, has an island platform and three exits.

Station layout

Around the station
 Jingmei Night Market
 Xianjiyan
 Shih Hsin University

References

Railway stations opened in 1999
1999 establishments in Taiwan
Songshan–Xindian line stations